BAP Unión (BEV-161) is a training ship of the Peruvian Navy built between 2012–2015 by Shipyard Marine Industrial Services of Peru, known as SIMA. It is a four-masted, steel-hulled, class "A" barque, composed of 38 steel modules. The ship's name honors a Peruvian corvette that took part in the first stage of the 1879–1883 War of the Pacific as part of a naval squadron under the command of Miguel Grau, a hero of the Peruvian Navy.

Like other similar ships, Unión has been conceived not only for training purposes, but also to be a sailing ambassador for its home country. Due to its features and dimensions, it has been considered (as of the date it was commissioned) the largest sail vessel in Latin America.

History 

For a long time, the Peruvian Navy desired a training ship for instruction of its cadets. Accordingly, the Peruvian government enacted 1985 Law N° 24094, which declared as a public necessity the navy having this kind of ship. However, due to the economic crisis of debt and hyper-inflation Peru suffered at the end of the 1980s, and later for public spending restraints, the project was postponed.

Eventually, in 2010 the project was approved and the construction was authorized. In 2012 the Peruvian government announced its decision to order the ship's construction to the Shipyard Marine Industrial Services of Peru, known as SIMA; in cooperation with the Government of Spain, through the contractors Cypsa Ingenieros Navales and Navantia, which were responsible for the ship's structural design. The government named the ship Union to honor a Peruvian corvette that took part in the first stage of the 1879–1883 War of the Pacific as part of a naval squadron under the command of Miguel Grau, a hero of the Peruvian Navy. On December 8, 2012 Unións construction began with a keel laying ceremony in the presence of Peruvian president Ollanta Humala. The hull was finished two years later and  the ship was launched on December 22, 2014.

In June 2015, the ship received its masts and propeller; and the interior fitout began in charge of contractors Acopafi and MO Contract. Also, according to an agreement between SIMA and Navantia, the ship was provided with an "Integrated Control System Platform, Navigation and Communications".

While the ship was under construction, the Peruvian government arranged training for the future Unións crew with the help of an instructor from the Spanish Navy and by sending personnel to serve on training ships of other countries, such as the Mexican sailing ship . Also, a Peruvian delegation was sent to take part in maintenance and repair works on Colombian sailing ship .

On January 27, 2016 BAP Unión was commissioned in an official flag raising ceremony held on its deck witnessed by the President Ollanta Humala, Jakke Valakivi, the Minister of Defense and Admiral Edmundo Deville, the Commander of the Navy. Captain Gianfranco Polar Figari was named to be the first captain of the ship, who conducted the sea trials of the vessel in June 2016.

BAP Unións first training cruise abroad began on July 27, 2016. The set sailing ceremony was attended by Pedro Cateriano, the President of the Council of Ministers, Jakke Valakivi, the Minister of Defense, Ana María Sanchez, the Minister of Foreign Affairs, and Admiral Edmundo Deville, the Commander of the Navy, among other authorities.

As a sailing ambassador promoting the peruvian nation brand, since 2020 the ship flies a sail with the Peru brand logo and visits national and international ports providing information about peruvian flagship products like pisco, asparagus, tangerines, paprika, anchovies, among others; as well as Peruvian tourist destinations.

Characteristics 

Although the main purpose of Unión is to serve as a training ship for the Peruvian Navy, it has also been conceived to be a sailing ambassador for her home country. Due to its features and dimensions, it has been considered (as of the date it was commissioned) the largest sail vessel in Latin America.

Specifications 
BAP Unión is a four-masted barque with a hull composed of 38 steel modules.

The ship's propulsion is supported by a diesel Caterpillar 3516H engine, a BERG propeller, a Rolls-Royce maneuvering propeller and a Reintjes LAF-863L gearbox.

BAP Unión is also equipped with AZCUE pumps for different applications including: BT-IL45D4-F, BT-HM25D4, KL30S40, LN-VP-40-160, CA-50-3, CA-40-1, MO-11/20, MO-19/20.

Figurehead 

The ship's figurehead was made of bronze by the Peruvian sculptor Pilar Martínez Woodman, and it features several symbols of the Inca culture that previously existed in what is now Peru. As the main element it shows the image of the Sapa Inca (emperor) Tupac Yupanqui, known as "The Shining", who appears with his right arm raised to the image of the Inca sun god Inti; and who is placed over a representation of the archeological artefact known the twelve-angled stone. The Sapa Inca wears a checkered cloth and a cape that depicts ocean waves. He also wears two puma heads (the puma was a sacred animal in Inca culture) as knee guards. His head is adorned with the mascapaicha (the Inca crown); and the shield he holds has the image of two rhombuses that represent the Inca Empire, known as Tawantinsuyu.

Escutcheon
Unións escutcheon depicts the ship sailing over the ocean with the motto Cudendum Character Nautarum ("forging sailors' character") written in Latin below. It also contains an image of the sky with representations of the constellations Ursa minor and Crux. Over the escutcheon is the image of a bright sun and the legend "Marina de Guerra del Perú" (Navy of Peru) and below the name and number of the ship.

Interior equipment for training 
Due to its use as a training ship, Unións interior includes an auditorium, a library, a computing platform and classrooms to instruct cadets in astronomic navigation; meteorology; oceanography; hydrography; and naval operations and maneuvers.

Voyages and trophies 

Unións first training cruise abroad was in July 2016. The journey, which was officially named as "VIEX 2016", acronym in Spanish of "Viaje de Instrucción al Extranjero 2016" (Training Trip Abroad 2016), had a length of three months, in which the Unión crew visited the ports of Guayaquil (Ecuador), Cartagena (Colombia), San Juan (Puerto Rico), La Habana (Cuba), Miami (United States), Veracruz (Mexico) and Balboa (Panama), before to returning to its base in Callao. The crew and navy cadets received instruction in naval exercises and maneuvers, as well as showing people abroad several elements of Peruvian culture.

In 2017 the Peruvian Navy organized the "VIEX 2017". As a part of this journey, Unión participated in Rendez-Vous 2017 Tall Ships Regatta, a series of races organized by Sail Training International, where the vessel won the race from Boston to Charlottetown (Gulf of Saint Lawrence) in Canada. In July 2017 Unión docked in South Quay in Canary Wharf, London, on a trip to foster Anglo-Peruvian relations, the visit coinciding with Peru's national day on 28 July. The Peruvian Ambassador to the Court of St James's attended the vessel.

In 2018 Unión participated in the event "Velas Latinoamérica 2018" (Sails Latin America), an international sailing regatta held every four years for ships from some Latin American countries. As part of this, the vessel visited several ports including Valparaiso, Guayaquil, Balboa, Curazao, Cartagena and Veracruz.

United States Postal Service honors BAP Unión

Peru figured prominently in the history of the city of San Francisco with a strong relationship between San Francisco and Lima, Peru.  The United States Postal Service issued a USPS Building Bridges Special Postal Cancellation Series on Feb 18, 2021 as part of a ceremony to celebrate The Bicentennial of the Independence of Peru. commemorating the Opening Ceremony on Feb 18, 1939 of the Golden Gate International Exposition on Treasure Island, San Francisco, California, United States of America.  The pictorial special postal cancellation features an illustration of the Peruvian Tall Ship BAP Unión, Treasure Island Museum logo and the official logo for Peru Bicentario 2021. The signatory image of Building Bridges, which marks all USPS Building Bridges Special Postal Cancellations, was created by Karen Earle Lile and Kendall Ross Bean in 1994 and first used by USPS in 1996.

The General Consul of Peru in San Francisco on Feb 19, 1939, Fernando Berckemeyer spoke at the Opening Ceremony of the Golden Gate International Exposition, also known as GGIE.  As a commemoration of GGIE On Feb 18, 2021, the General Consul of Peru in San Francisco, Hernando Torres-Fernández, spoke at the USPS Building Bridges Special Cancellation of that ceremony, which was filmed for broadcast internationally on special event site.

See also
 List of large sailing vessels

References

External links

 Marina de Guerra del Peru at Marina de Guerra del Peru 
 Servicios Industriales de la Marina – SIMA at SIMA Peru 
 Hardco Consulting, Inc., member of HC GROUP, supplier of several components for BAP UNION 

Ships of the Peruvian Navy
Training ships of the Peruvian Navy
Naval ships of Peru
Four-masted ships
Full-rigged ships
Training ships
2014 ships
Ships built in Peru